Acanthemblemaria aspera, the roughhead blenny is a species of blenny native to the tropical western Atlantic Ocean.

References

Acanthemblemaria
Fish of the Caribbean
Taxa named by William Harding Longley
Fish described in 1927